Thyca astericola is a species of sea snail, a marine gastropod mollusk in the family Eulimidae. The species is one of a number within the genus Thyca.

Description
The white shell attains a height of 6 mm. It is high-conical and sculptured with fine close-set radiating riblets. The margin is 
crenulated.

Distribution
The type species was found in the Sooloo Sea, north of Borneo, on the tubercle of a starfish.

References

 Warén A. (1980). Revision of the genera Thyca, Stilifer, Scalenostoma, Mucronalia and Echineulima (Mollusca, Prosobranchia, Eulimidae). Zoologica Scripta 9: 187-210

External links
 To World Register of Marine Species

Eulimidae
Gastropods described in 1850